Along Came Polly is a 2004 American romantic comedy film written and directed by John Hamburg and starring Ben Stiller and Jennifer Aniston. The story follows Reuben Feffer who finds his life taking a different turn when he reconnects and falls in love with his old classmate, Polly. Chaos ensues when his former wife, Lisa, returns to reconcile with him.

The film was released on January 16, 2004. It received mixed reviews and grossed $178 million worldwide.

Plot
Reuben Feffer, a risk-averse actuary for a large life insurance company, is celebrating his honeymoon with his new wife, Lisa Kramer, on the island of St. Barts, but catches her having sex with Claude, a French scuba instructor. Returning home to New York alone, he attempts to piece his life back together. Reuben goes to an art gallery with his friend, Sandy Lyle, where he runs into former junior high school classmate Polly Prince.

Reuben and Polly begin dating. She introduces him to activities he once wrote off as "too risky". This includes eating at a Moroccan restaurant, which ends badly due to Reuben's irritable bowel syndrome. Luckily, Polly gives him a second chance where they end up salsa dancing and later enthusiastically having sex, with Reuben shouting "50" at the climax.

The contrast between their two personalities is a source of comedy until Lisa returns and tells him she wants to reconcile. Meanwhile, Sandy, a self-centered, former teen idol, is trying to make a comeback by having an E! True Hollywood Story filmed about his life while starring as Judas in an amateur production of Jesus Christ Superstar.

Reuben is torn between the free spirited Polly and the safe and familiar Lisa. To solve this issue, he enters information about them both into a computer insurance program which measures risk, but tilts the program towards Polly. The computer tells him that, despite his numerous blunders with her, she is the least risky choice for Reuben.

Polly joins Reuben on a sailing trip where he is to inspect Leland Van Lew, a high risk client, but she is offended when she sees his risk analysis of her. She rejects his proposal to move in together, telling him that he would be better off going back to Lisa. Back home, Reuben tries talking to Polly, but to no avail. He eventually invites Lisa to Sandy's opening show, where he learns that Polly is leaving New York in a few hours.

After a speech given by his father, Irving, to Sandy about not living in the past, Reuben realizes he wants to be with Polly and not Lisa, and he rushes to her apartment to stop her from leaving. Meanwhile, Sandy fills in for Reuben for his risk analysis presentation on Leland and successfully grants him his insurance.

Reuben eventually catches up with Polly and tries to persuade her to stay. She is not convinced she should stay with him, so he eats food off the ground to prove he is capable of taking risks. Polly is finally convinced and ends up dating Reuben, but they both agree they will take their relationship step-by-step and not rush into marriage.

Reuben and Polly vacation on the same beach where he and Lisa had their honeymoon. Reuben again encounters Claude, but instead of being angry, he thanks him for showing the ugly truth about Lisa before heading nude into the water with Polly to join Leland on his new boat.

Cast

 Ben Stiller as Reuben Feffer
 Jennifer Aniston as Polly Prince
 Philip Seymour Hoffman as Sandford "Sandy" Lyle
Debra Messing as Lisa Kramer
 Alec Baldwin as Stanley "Stan" Indursky
 Hank Azaria as Claude
 Missi Pyle as Roxanne
 Bryan Brown as Leland Van Lew
 Jsu Garcia as Javier
 Michele Lee as Vivian Feffer
 Bob Dishy as Irving Feffer
 Masi Oka as Wonsuk
 Judah Friedlander as Dustin
 Kym Whitley as Gladys 
 Kevin Hart as Vic
 Cheryl Hines as the Catering Manager
 Todd Stashwick as the Security Officer
 Christine Barger as the JCS Singer/Mary Magdalene

Reception

Box office
The film opened at #1 at the box office in the United States, earning US$27,721,185 in its opening weekend, ending the month long reign of  The Lord of the Rings: The Return of the King. The film was released in the United Kingdom on February 27, 2004, and topped the country's box office for the next two weekends.

The film was a financial success, making $178 million at the box office worldwide off a $42 million budget.

Critical response
On Rotten Tomatoes the film holds an approval of 27% based on 162 reviews, with an average rating of 4.78/10. The site's critics consensus reads, "Though the supporting actors are funny, Stiller and Aniston don't make a believable couple, and the gross out humor is gratuitous." Metacritic assigned the film a weighted average score of 44 out of 100 based on 35 critics, indicating "mixed or average reviews". Audiences polled by CinemaScore gave the film an average grade of "B" on an A+ to F scale.

Soundtrack

References

External links
 
 
 

2000s English-language films
2004 romantic comedy films
2004 films
Adultery in films
American romantic comedy films
Films about honeymoon
Films directed by John Hamburg
Films produced by Danny DeVito
Films scored by Theodore Shapiro
Films set in New York (state)
Films set in the Caribbean
Films with screenplays by John Hamburg
Saint Barthélemy culture
Universal Pictures films
2000s American films